Japan–Russia relations (Rossiysko-yaponskiye otnosheniya; , Nichiro kankei) or 
Japanese–Russian relations are the bilateral international relations between Japan and the Russian Federation. Relations between Russia and Japan are the continuation of the relationship of Japan with the Soviet Union from 1917 to 1991, and with the Russian Empire from 1855 to 1917. Historically, the two countries had cordial relations until a clash of territorial ambitions in the Manchuria region of northeastern China led to the Russo–Japanese War in 1904, ending in a Japanese victory which contributed to the weakening of the monarchy in Russia. Japan would later intervene in the Russian Civil War from 1918 until 1922, sending troops to the Russian Far East and Siberia. That was followed by border conflicts between the new Soviet Union and the Empire of Japan throughout the 1930s. The two countries signed a nonaggression pact in 1941, although the Soviet government declared war on Japan anyway in August 1945, invading the Japanese puppet state of Manchukuo as well as seizing the Kuril chain of islands just north of Japan. The two countries ended their formal state of war with the Soviet–Japanese Joint Declaration of 1956, but as of 2022 have not resolved this territorial dispute over ownership of the Kurils.

A 2018 opinion poll published by the Russian Levada Center shows that 61% of Russians have a favorable view of Japan, with 20% expressing a negative opinion. According to a 2017 Pew Global Attitudes Project survey, 64% of Japanese people view Russia unfavorably, compared with 26% who viewed it favorably. People ages 50 and older are much less likely to hold a favorable view of Russia (16%) than those 18 to 29 (53%). Nonetheless, the Japanese government sees Russia as an important partner for security and counterbalancing China and North Korea in the region. Because of this, since the start of Euromaidan and the 2014 annexation of Crimea, Japan continued to engage with Russia in spite of sanctions against the country by Japan's Western allies. The governments of the two countries have taken efforts to increase relations, including Japanese investment in Russia, military cooperation, and organizing a year of cultural exchange between Russia and Japan for 2018.

In 2022, Japan imposed sanctions on Russia for its invasion of Ukraine. Japan and Russia each expelled a number of diplomats and Russia halted peace negotiations with Japan that include talks on resolving the Kuril Islands dispute.

History
Russian navigator Adam Laxman was sent by Catherine the Great to return Japanese castaway Daikokuya Kōdayū to Japan. Russian diplomat Nikolai Rezanov was commissioned by Alexander I as Russian ambassador to Japan to conclude a commercial treaty, but his efforts were thwarted by the Japanese government.

Tsarist era (1855–1917)
 
Diplomatic and commercial relations between the two empires were established from 1855 onwards. Japan and Russia participated in the suppression of the Boxer Rebellion in China. Relations were minimal before 1855, mostly friendly from 1855 to the early 1890s, then turned hostile over the status of Korea. The two nations contested control of Manchuria and Korea, leading to Japanese victory in the Russo-Japanese War of 1904–1905. Russia began construction of the Trans-Siberian railroad, which for the first time gave it easy access to Siberia and adjacent areas. Meanwhile, Japan's defeat of China in 1894-95 Sino-Japanese war demonstrated Japan's military modernization, and its quest for control of Korea. Russia and Japan both were making inroads into Chinese territories, especially in Manchuria. both were blocked from moving south of Manchuria by the strength of British and American resistance.  Relations were good 1905–1917, as the two countries divided up Manchuria and Outer Mongolia.

Soviet era (1917–1991)

Relations between the Communist takeover in 1917 and the collapse of Communism in 1991 tended to be hostile. Japan had sent troops to counter the Bolshevik presence in Russia's Far East during the Russian Civil War, but left without any gains.

Relations were tense in the 1930s, as Japan took full control of Manchuria in 1931 and made war on China in 1937. Moscow favored China. The Russians defeated Japan at the bloody Nomonhan Incident in 1939. Japanese leaders decided to avoid any war with the USSR and instead turned south against Britain, the Netherlands and the United States.

The USSR declared war on Japan in August 1945 invaded Japanese-controlled areas of Korea and Manchuria, swiftly capturing the defenders.  Moscow kept POWs after the war in years of forced labor, a concern that heightened Japan's support of the anti-Soviet side of the Cold War.

The U.S. had full control of the Occupation of Japan, to Moscow's annoyance. In response Moscow refused to sign the 1951 peace treaty.  Therefore, the state of war between the Soviet Union and Japan technically existed until 1956, when it was ended by the Soviet–Japanese Joint Declaration of 1956.  A formal peace treaty still has not been signed. The key stumbling block to improving relations between the Soviet Union and Japan in the post-war period has been the territorial dispute over the Kurils, which are known as the Northern Territories in Japan.

After 1975, the Soviet Union began openly to warn that a Japanese peace treaty with China would jeopardize Soviet–Japan relations. The signing of the Sino-Japanese peace treaty in mid-1978 was a major setback to Japanese-Soviet relations. Moscow saw it as placing Tokyo with Washington and Beijing firmly in the anti-Soviet camp. Soviet actions served only to alarm and alienate the Japanese side. The 1980s Soviet military buildup in the Pacific was a case in point.

The 1980s saw a decided hardening in Japanese attitudes toward the Soviet Union. Japan was pressed by the United States to do more to check the expansion of Soviet power in the developing world following the December 1979 Soviet invasion of Afghanistan. It responded by cutting off contacts beneficial to the Soviet regime and providing assistance to "front line" states, such as Pakistan and Thailand. Under Prime Minister Yasuhiro Nakasone, Japan worked hard to demonstrate a close identity of views with the Reagan administration on the "Soviet threat". Japan steadily built up its military forces, welcomed increases in United States forces in Japan and the western Pacific, and pledged close cooperation to deal with the danger posed by Soviet power.

This economic cooperation was interrupted by Japan's decision in 1980 to participate in sanctions against the Soviet Union for its invasion of Afghanistan and by its actions to hold in abeyance a number of projects being negotiated, to ban the export of some high-technology items, and to suspend Siberian development loans. Subsequently, Japanese interest in economic cooperation with the Soviet Union waned as Tokyo found alternative suppliers and remained uncertain about the economic viability and political stability of the Soviet Union under Gorbachev. Japan-Soviet trade in 1988 was valued at nearly US$6 billion.

Although public and media opinion remained skeptical of the danger to Japan posed by Soviet forces in Asia, there was strong opposition in Japan to Moscow's refusal to accede to Japan's claims to the Northern Territories, known to the Japanese as Etorofu and Kunashiri, at the southern end of the Kuril Island chain, and the smaller island of Shikotan and the Habomai Islands, northeast of Hokkaidō, which were seized by the Soviets in the last days of World War II. The stationing of Soviet military forces on the islands gave tangible proof of the Soviet threat, and provocative maneuvers by Soviet air and naval forces in Japanese-claimed territory served to reinforce Japanese official policy of close identification with a firm United States-backed posture against Soviet power. In 1979, the Japanese government specifically protested a buildup in Soviet forces in Etorofu, Kunashiri, and Shikotan.

The advent of the Mikhail Gorbachev regime in Moscow in 1985 saw a replacement of hard-line Soviet government diplomats who were expert in Asian affairs with more flexible spokespersons calling for greater contact with Japan. Gorbachev took the lead in promising new initiatives in Asia, but the substance of Soviet policy changed more slowly. Tima and again Gorbachev was uncompromising regarding the Northern Territories. Furthermore, Soviet forces in the western Pacific still seemed focused on and threatening to Japan, and Soviet economic troubles and lack of foreign exchange made prospects for Japan-Soviet Union economic relations appear poor. By 1990, Japan appeared to be the least enthusiastic of the major Western-aligned developed countries in encouraging greater contacts with and assistance to the Soviet Union.

Changes in Soviet policy carried out under Gorbachev beginning in the mid-1980s, including attempts at domestic reform and the pursuit of détente with the United States and Western Europe, elicited generally positive Japanese interest, but the Japanese government held that Moscow had not changed its policies on issues vital to Japan. The government stated that it would not conduct normal relations with the Soviet Union until Moscow returned the Northern Territories. The government and Japanese business leaders stated further that Japanese trade with and investment in the Soviet Union would not grow appreciably until the Northern Territories issue has been resolved.

Early post-Soviet era (1991–1999)
By the late 1990s, the Russian leadership began to pivot from West to East, considering improving relations with Japan as part of this effort, and viewed Prime Minister Ryutaro Hashimoto's position as an opportunity. President Boris Yeltsin met with Prime Minister Hashimoto in Krasnoyarsk on 1 November 1997, where he proposed to solve the territorial problem with a peace treaty by 2000. Yeltsin also asked Hashimoto to consider financial assistance to Russia to the measure of $3 or $4 billion. Hashimoto also promoted the idea of increasing economic cooperation, which was called the Hashimoto–Yeltsin plan. In mid-April 1998, the Kanawa summit between the two leaders included Hashimoto making a proposal of having the four disputed Kuril islands coming under Japanese sovereignty. Yeltsin made a public statement about it and that he was considering accepting it, which prompted the Russian government and media to unite against this. By the autumn of 1998, the proposal had died after so much opposition in Russia, and Hashimoto was out of office after the July 1998 parliamentary election. Nonetheless, about $1.5 billion of the World Bank/IMF loan to Russia came from Japan. A meeting in November 1998 between Foreign Minister Keizo Obuchi and Yeltsin in Moscow took place, where Russia proposed to give Japan special status over the islands jointly with Russia as transitory legal regime. The Japanese side was cautious to the proposal and by 1999 there was a stalemate on the territorial question, while the economic initiatives stalled in their implementation.

On July 30, 1998, the newly elected Japanese prime minister Keizō Obuchi had focused on major issues: signing a peace treaty with Russia, and renewing the Japanese economy. However, he died soon afterwards.

Current relations (1999–present)

In March 2014, following Russia's annexation of Crimea, Japan imposed several sanctions against Russia, which included halting consultations on easing the visa regulations between the two countries and suspension of talks on investment cooperation, joint space exploration and prevention of dangerous military activity.

On 27 April 2018, in Moscow was held the fourth Russia-Japan forum dubbed The Points of Convergence, where the sides discussed pressing issues concerning the two countries’ trade and economic relations. Toshihiro Nikai, the secretary general of Japan's ruling Liberal Democratic Party, was the forum's special guest, read out Japanese Prime Minister Shinzo Abe's address at the event's opening ceremony. Participants discussed the two countries’ tourism cooperation, investment projects for the Far East and other Russian regions, as well as interaction in the areas of infrastructure, technology and energy industry.

On June 23, 2018, Russia and Japan inked a memorandum of understanding (MOU) in Russia's Far Eastern Republic of Sakha (Yakutia) to expand cooperation between the two countries.

In June 2018, Japan's Princess Hisako Takamado travelled to Russia to cheer on her national team at the FIFA World Cup. She is the first member of the Imperial family to come to Russia since 1916.

In November 2019, Japan's foreign minister stated that he will visit Russia in December for talks about a formal World War Two peace treaty, in an effort to improve relations.

In March 7, 2022, in a House of Councillors Budget Committee session Japan's Prime Minister Fumio Kishida described a chain of islets off the northernmost prefecture of Hokkaido that have been long-disputed with Russia as Japan's "inherent territory". Also in solidarity with Ukraine over Russia's invasion of Ukraine, Japan joined in the implementation of the Western-led sanctions against Russia and Belarus, by sanctioning a number of people linked to the Russian regime and revoking Russia's "most favored nation" status.

Despite suggestions from LDP lawmakers, prime minister Kishida did not abolish the post of Minister for Economic Cooperation with Russia in the August 2022 reshuffle. The newly-appointed minister Yasutoshi Nishimura stated there is no policy change in keeping interests in the Sakhalin-II oil and gas project in Russia, one of the world’s largest integrated oil and gas projects owned by Gazprom, Shell, Mitsui and Mitsubishi.

Kuril Islands dispute

Relations between Russia and Japan since the end of World War II have been defined by the dispute over sovereignty of the Kuril Islands and concluding a peace treaty. In the spring of 1992 the Russian General Staff received reports that the Japanese began discussing the possible return of the northern territories. President Boris Yeltsin was considering giving up the Southern Kurils in 1992. Throughout the 1990s, efforts were made to come to some agreement by President Yeltsin and Prime Minister Keizō Obuchi. One of the goals of the Obuchi was to sign a peace treaty with Russia by 2000, which he did not achieve. He visited Russia in November 1998.

On August 16, 2006, Russian maritime authorities killed a Japanese fisherman and captured a crab fishing boat in the waters around the disputed Kuril Islands. The Russian foreign ministry has claimed that the death was caused by a "stray bullet".

On September 28, 2006, Russian Foreign Minister Sergei Lavrov said Russia would "continue the dialogue with the new Japanese government. We will build our relations, how the people of the two countries want them to be. Then-Foreign Minister Taro Aso remained on his post in the government. We have good, long-standing relations, we will act under the elaborated program."

The dispute over the Southern Kuril Islands deteriorated Russo-Japan relations when the Japanese government published a new guideline for school textbooks on July 16, 2008 to teach Japanese children that their country has sovereignty over the Kuril Islands. The Russian public was generally outraged by the action and demanded the government to counteract. The Foreign Ministry of Russia announced on July 18, 2008 "[these actions] contribute neither to the development of positive cooperation between the two countries, nor to the settlement of the dispute," and reaffirmed its sovereignty over the islands.

In 2010, President of Russia Dmitry Medvedev became the first Russian president to take a state trip to the Kuril Islands. Medvedev shortly ordered significant reinforcements to the Russian defences on the Kuril Islands. Medvedev was replaced by Vladimir Putin in 2012.

In November 2013, Japan held its first ever diplomatic talks with the Russian Federation, and the first with Moscow since the year 1973.

In September 2017, Prime Minister Shinzo Abe and Russian President Vladimir Putin met at Eastern Economic Forum, which held at Far Eastern Federal University in Vladivostok. The main reason of meeting was approving joint economic activities on disputed islands off Hokkaido. In their talks the two leaders decided to sign off on joint projects in five areas — aquaculture, greenhouse farming, tourism, wind power and waste reduction.

At the 2018 Thirteenth East Asia Summit in Singapore, Shinzo Abe followed up on a proposal from Vladimir Putin to sign a peace treaty without preconditions by the end of the year. The Soviet–Japanese Joint Declaration of 1956 promised that the USSR would give Japan the Habomai islet group and Shikotan and keep the remaining islands, in return for negotiation of a formal peace treaty. At the time, the United States threatened to keep Okinawa if Japan gave away the other islands, preventing the negotiation of the promised treaty. Putin and Abe agreed that the terms of the 1956 deal would be part of a bilateral peace treaty.

The outbreak of the 2022 Russian invasion of Ukraine prompted Japan's hardline stance on the disputed islands. On March 7, 2022, Prime Minister Fumio Kishida declared the southern Kurils as "a territory peculiar to Japan, a territory in which Japan has sovereignty." Foreign Minister Yoshimasa Hayashi added that they are an "integral part" of Japan.

Military cooperation

The Russian Chief of General Staff, General Valery Gerasimov, visited Tokyo in mid-December 2017 to meet with his Japanese counterpart, Admiral Katsutoshi Kawano. He stated that there will be more than thirty joint military drills held by Russia and Japan in 2018.
Russia's military chief, Gen. Valery Gerasimov, warned Defense Minister Itsunori Onodera in Tokyo that military exercises conducted by the United States around the Korean Peninsula will destabilize the region. Apparently with such exercises in mind, Gerasimov told Onodera at the outset of their talks, “Exercises in surrounding areas would increase tension and bring instability.” Onodera sought Russia's cooperation in dealing with North Korea's nuclear and missile provocations, saying Moscow has “big clout” with North Korea.

See also

 Russians in Japan
 Japanese people in Russia
 Empire of Japan–Russian Empire relations
 Japan–Soviet Union relations
 Ninja-Russia relations, on Japanese spies
 International relations of the Great Powers (1814–1919)
 Diplomatic history of World War I
 International relations (1919–1939)
 Diplomatic history of World War II
 Cold War
 International relations since 1989

References

General
  - Japan

Further reading
 Allison, Graham, Hiroshi Kimura and Konstantin Sarkisov, eds. Beyond Cold War to Trilateral Cooperation in the Asia-Pacific Region: Scenarios for new relationships between Japan, Russia, and the United States (Harvard University Press, 1993)
 Brown, James D.J.  "Japan's foreign relations with Russia." in James D.J. Brown and Jeff Kingston, eds. Japan's Foreign Relations in Asia (2018): 248–61. 
 Brown, James D.J. Japan, Russia and their territorial dispute: The northern delusion. (Routledge, 2016).
Ferguson, Joseph. Japanese-Russian Relations, 1907-2007 (Routledge, 2008)
 Hara,   Kimie.   Japanese-Soviet/Russian Relations since 1945: A Difficult Peace (1998) online
 Hasegawa, Tsuyoshi. The Northern Territories Dispute And Russo-Japanese Relations" volume 1: Between War and Peace, 1697-1985 (Research Series-Institute Of International Studies University Of California Berkeley  (1998).
 Hasegawa, Tsuyoshi. The Northern Territories Dispute And Russo-Japanese Relations: Volume 2-Neither War Nor Peace, 1985-1998. (Research Series-Institute Of International Studies University Of California Berkeley (1998).
 Hyodo, Shinji. "Russia's Strategic Concerns in the Arctic and Its Impact on Japan–Russia Relations." Strategic Analysis 38.6 (2014): 860–871.
 Kimura, Hiroshi. Japanese-Russian Relations Under Brezhnev and Andropov (M.E. Sharpe. 2000)
 Kimura, Hiroshi. Japanese-Russian Relations Under Gorbachev and Yeltsin (Routledge, 2016).
 Moore, Harriet L. Soviet Far Eastern Policy, 1931-1945 (Princeton UP, 1945). online
 Rozman, Gilbert and Sergey Radchenko, eds. International Relations and Asia's Northern Tier (Palgrave, Singapore, 2018)  excerpt
 Rozman, Gilbert, ed. Japan and Russia: The Tortuous Path to Normalization, 1949-1999 (2000)
 Yakhontoff, Victor A. Russia And The Soviet Union In The Far East (1932) online

External links

Embassy of Japan in Moscow
Consulate-General of Japan in Khabarovsk
Consulate-General of Japan in Saint Petersburg
Consulate-General of Japan in Vladivostok
Consulate-General of Japan in Yuzhno-Sakhalinsk
Embassy of the Russian Federation in Tokyo
Consulate-General of the Russian Federation in Sapporo
Database of Russian-Japanese relations

 
Bilateral relations of Russia
Russia